Lac du Lauzanier is a lake in Alpes-de-Haute-Provence, France.

Lauzanier
Landforms of Alpes-de-Haute-Provence